Pride Bands Alliance is an international network of LGBTQ+ and affirming bands.  Pride Bands Alliance was originally formed as the Lesbian and Gay Bands of America when members of seven independent lesbian and gay bands met formally in Chicago from October 1–3, 1982.  Those bands were the San Francisco Lesbian/Gay Freedom Band (founded June, 1978), the Montrose March Band (Houston, founded June, 1978), the Los Angeles Great American Yankee (GAY) Freedom Band (founded October, 1978), the New York Gay Community Marching Band (founded September, 1979), the Chicago Gay/Lesbian Community Band (founded 1979), DC's Different Drummers (Washington, DC, founded January 7, 1980), and the Oak Lawn Symphonic Band (Dallas, founded May 6, 1980), and the Minnesota Freedom Band (Minneapolis founded September 12, 1982). In 2003 the organization changed the name to Lesbian and Gay Band Association and in 2021 to Pride Bands Alliance to reflect the diversity of the membership.  Pride Bands Alliance currently includes over 30 bands in the United States, Canada, United Kingdom, and Australia.

The purpose of Pride Bands Alliance is to promote LGBTQ+ Music, Visibility, and Pride by:

Providing an international network of LGBTQ+ and affirming bands in all stages of development;
Promoting music as a medium of communication among people;
Improving the quality of artistic and organizational aspects of member bands; and
Stimulating public interest in the unique art form of community bands in our culture.

Membership 
Pride Bands Alliance is made up of member bands, partner groups, and individual affiliate members.

Great performances are the most visible manifestation of the pride band movement. Member bands across the country appear in hundreds of concerts, parades, and community events every year. Member bands in geographic proximity often perform together, and a typical marching schedule will include LGBTQ+ pride parades in several different cities.

Pride Bands Alliance strives to unite people who share a love of band music, and the bands help create and enhance the "community" its members call home. Pride Bands Alliance member bands are sources of pride within their cities, as well as positive symbols of the same communities. Making music creates a family where affection means more than affectional preference. By "banding together," Pride Bands Alliance shows that people of different sexes, ages, creeds, races, and challenges can build a strong community.

Conferences and Special Events 

Pride Bands Alliance meets annually hosted by one or more member bands. Members of bands from around the world gather to conduct organizational business, elect officers, encourage the formation of new bands, and share the gift of music. Seminars on topics such as musicianship, programming, membership diversity, and organizational skills are held in addition to general business and committee meetings. Often special ensembles such as saxophone choirs, clarinet choirs and jazz bands are organized by the membership and perform at the conferences. There have been special guest conductors and composers at past Pride Bands Alliance annual conferences.

At the 2004 conference in Fort Lauderdale the massed band played Russian Christmas Music under the direction of composer Alfred Reed, and In Glory Triumphant conducted by composer Robert Longfield. During the 2005 conference, composer Frank Ticheli conducted a band of 120 musicians in Abracadabra and An American Elegy.

For the 2012 Conference in Dallas, the Pride Bands Alliance commissioned a new work by composer Michael Markowski. He composed City Trees to Commemorate 30 Years of Music, Visibility, and Pride.

The 2018 conference, "There's No Place Like Home" was held in Kansas City, Missouri.

The Orlando conference in 2019 was hosted by the three Pride Bands Alliance member bands in Florida, the South Florida Pride Wind Ensemble of Fort Lauderdale, the Tampa Bay Pride Band, and the Central Florida Sounds of Freedom Band and Color Guard in Orlando.  The concert included the world premiere of two commission pieces by LGBTQ+ composers. Julie Giroux composed and conducted My Soul to Keep, dedicated to all touched by gun violence. Randall Standridge composed Stonewall: 1969, to commemorate the 50th Anniversary of the Stonewall Riots.

Notable performances
Pride Bands Alliance was the first openly LGBTQ+ organization invited to participate in a parade and review of the United States presidential inauguration, first doing so in 2009. The 2013 inaugural featured a 215-strong Pride Bands Alliance contingent hailing from different U.S. localities. Members of then Pride Bands Alliance also performed during both inaugurals of President Bill Clinton in 1993 and 1997.

The Pride Bands Alliance performed in Washington, DC for the March on Washington for Lesbian, Gay and Bi Equal Rights and Liberation (1987) and again for the Millennium March on Washington in April 2000 with concerts at the Warner Theatre (1993) and on the steps of the Lincoln Memorial (2000).

The 4th conference was held in Los Angeles, CA and featured a concert at the Hollywood Bowl with special guest Rita Moreno. The concert, A Gay Night at the Bowl was performed on June 30, 1984.

See also
 Official Pride Bands Alliance site
 List of member organizations

References

LGBT-themed musical groups
Organizations established in 1982